The Chonghu'er Dam is a gravity dam on the river Burqin in Burqin County of Xinjiang Uighur Autonomous Region, China. Construction on the dam began in 2006 and it was completed in 2009.

See also

 Shankou Dam, a dam under construction downstream

References

Dams in China
Hydroelectric power stations in Xinjiang
Gravity dams
Dams completed in 2009
Energy infrastructure completed in 2009
Roller-compacted concrete dams
RChonghu'er